Luis Asprilla (born 6 December 1977) is a retired Colombian football defender.

He played for the Colombia national team in 2001. He has played outside Colombia for Olimpo de Bahía Blanca in Argentina and Emelec in Ecuador.

External links

1977 births
Living people
Footballers from Cali
Colombian footballers
Colombia international footballers
Association football defenders
Deportivo Pereira footballers
Deportes Tolima footballers
Real Cartagena footballers
América de Cali footballers
Olimpo footballers
Millonarios F.C. players
Atlético Bucaramanga footballers
C.S. Emelec footballers
Cúcuta Deportivo footballers
Atlético F.C. footballers
Alianza Atlético footballers
Bogotá FC footballers
Categoría Primera A players
Argentine Primera División players
Colombian expatriate footballers
Expatriate footballers in Argentina
Expatriate footballers in Ecuador
Expatriate footballers in Peru